Eugenio Coșeriu (27 July 1921 – 7 September 2002) was a linguist who specialized in Romance languages at the University of Tübingen, author of over 50 books, honorary member of the Romanian Academy.

In 1970 he coined the terms diatopic, diastratic and diaphasic to describe linguistic variation.

Biography
Coșeriu was born on July 27, 1921 in Mihăileni, a small Romanian town that today lies in the Republic of Moldova. He attended high school in Bălți, where Vadim Pirogan and Sergiu Grossu were his classmates. In 1944–1945 Coșeriu was at the University of Padua, then from 1945 to 1949 at the University of Milan, where he a obtained a PhD degree in philosophy, under the supervision of  Antonio Banfi.

Coșeriu was active at the University of the Republic in Uruguay as Professor of General and Indo-European Linguistics from 1950 to 1958. He then held visiting positions at the University of Málaga and the University of Navarra and a teaching position at the University of Coimbra.  From 1961 to 1963 he was invited professor at the University of Bonn and the University of Frankfurt, after which he moved permanently to the University of Tübingen, where he held the Professor of Romance Linguistics position until his retirement in 1991.

He was elected honorary member of the Romanian Academy in 1991.

Honours
 Biblioteca Municipală "Eugeniu Coșeriu", Bălți
 Colocviul Internațional de științe ale Limbajului "Eugeniu Coșeriu"
 "Eugen Coșeriu" High School Mihăileni, Bălți

Selected works
 Eugeniu Coșeriu, Teoría del lenguaje y lingüística general, Madrid, 1973
 Eugeniu Coșeriu, Sincronía, diacronía e historia, Madrid, 1973
 Eugeniu Coșeriu, Principios de semántica estructural, Madrid, 1978.
 Eugeniu Coșeriu, El hombre y su lenguaje: estudios de teoría y metodología lingüística, Madrid, 1985.
 Eugeniu Coșeriu, Tradición y novedad en la ciencia del lenguaje, Madrid, 1977.
 Eugeniu Coșeriu, Gramatica, semántica, universales, Madrid, 1978.
 Eugeniu Coșeriu, Lecții de lingvistică generală, Chișinău, ARC Publishing House, 2000.
 Eugeniu Coșeriu, "Limbaj și politică", in Revista de lingvistică și știință literară, 5/1996.
 Eugeniu Coșeriu, „Latinitatea orientală”, in Limba Română este patria mea. Studii. Comunicări. Documente, Chișinău, 1996, pp. 15–31.
 Eugeniu Coșeriu, „Unitatea limbii române – planuri și criterii”. Ibidem. p. 205-121.
 Eugeniu Coșeriu and Horst Geckeler.  Trends in structural semantics. (Tübinger Beiträge zur Linguistik, 158). Tübingen: Narr. 1981.

References

External links
 
 Evocare Eugeniu Coșeriu
 Liceul Teoretic „Ion Creangă” din Bălți

1921 births
2002 deaths
Romanian people of Moldovan descent
People from Bălți
People from Rîșcani District
Linguists from Romania
Alexandru Ioan Cuza University alumni
Sapienza University of Rome alumni
University of Milan alumni
Romanian expatriates in Uruguay
Academic staff of the University of the Republic (Uruguay)
Romanian expatriates in Germany
Academic staff of the University of Tübingen
20th-century linguists
Romanian expatriates in Italy
Translation scholars